Kamalpur Airport is a small airport located in Kamalpur, Tripura, India. The airport is spread over an approximately 61 acre area.  It is managed by the Airports Authority of India (AAI) and is non-operational. AAI plans to develop the airport for operation of ATR-42 and ATR-72 type of aircraft.

In the 1990s, Vayudoot used to fly its Dornier 228 aircraft from Agartala to Kamalpur.

References

External links
 Kamalpur on Airports Authority of India website
 Kamalpur on Jetrequest.com

Defunct airports in India
Airports in Tripura
Dhalai district